William Stephen Sutton (February 25, 1870 – August 14, 1937) was a Canadian politician who served as Mayor of Woodstock, New Brunswick from 1915 to 1916 and as a member of the Legislative Assembly of New Brunswick from 1916 to 1920.

Notes
1. Carleton County sent three representatives to the Legislative Assembly during Sutton's tenure. In 1920, Sutton, Frank Smith, and George L. White were succeeded by Rennie K. Tracey, Fred W. Smith, and Samuel J. Burlock.

References

Mayors of Woodstock, New Brunswick
Progressive Conservative Party of New Brunswick MLAs
1870 births
1937 deaths